Olvio is a settlement in the municipality Topeiros in the Xanthi regional unit of Greece. It is located six kilometers north of Evlalos and 24 kilometers northeast of Xanthi. In 1981, the population of Olvio was around 518 inhabitants. In 1991, the population of the settlement rose to about 593 inhabitants.

External links
Greek Travel Pages - Olvio

Populated places in Xanthi (regional unit)